The 2004–05 season was Birmingham City Football Club's 102nd season in the English football league system, their third season in the Premier League and their 53rd in the top tier of English football. It ran from 1 July 2004 to 30 June 2005. Under the management of former Birmingham City player Steve Bruce, the team finished in 12th place, two places lower than the season before. They reached the fourth round of the FA Cup and the third round of the League Cup. The top scorer for the season was England forward Emile Heskey with eleven goals in all competitions, of which ten were scored in the League.

Pre-season

Pre-season friendlies

Premier League

Season review

August
Steve Bruce named four debutants, Mario Melchiot, Muzzy Izzet, Jesper Grønkjær and club-record signing Emile Heskey, in the starting eleven for the opening-day visit to Portsmouth, with another, Julian Gray, on the bench. Robbie Savage's free kick gave Birmingham an early lead, equalised from the penalty spot five minutes later. Both goalkeepers excelled in the 1–1 draw. Birmingham's midfield dominated at home to Chelsea, but neither team's strikers were on form; the only goal came from substitute Joe Cole's second-half shot deflected past Maik Taylor off Martin Taylor. Heskey's first goal for his new club, an "unstoppable header" from Stan Lazaridis' cross, was enough to beat Manchester City and ended a run of 11 winless Premier League games, but he had an "awful day in front of goal" and was booked for diving against Tottenham Hotspur at White Hart Lane, where Jermain Defoe's solo goal was the difference between the sides.

September
Even with new signing Dwight Yorke on the left wing, Heskey and Mikael Forssell up front, and two penalty appeals, Birmingham only managed one goal to Mark Viduka's two for Middlesbrough. Maik Taylor's error allowed Charlton Athletic to take a lead, and after Damien Johnson was sent off for two yellow cards, Bruce brought on Yorke and David Dunn, making his first appearance of the season after injury. Dunn was instrumental in the play that led to Izzet's corner from which Yorke headed an equaliser, and Birmingham were the better side thereafter. Without Forssell, whose loan was ended early after exploratory surgery found a serious issue with his knee, Bruce selected a five-man midfield with Heskey as lone striker away to fourth-placed Bolton Wanderers. They duly fell behind, Izzet equalised just after half-time, and the game ended 1–1 after Henrik Pedersen's goal for Bolton was incorrectly disallowed for offside and Heskey's last-seconds header "was going in until it diverted past the far post."

October
Nicky Butt scored an equaliser when Newcastle United came to St Andrew's. Goals from Yorke and Upson had given Birmingham a 2–1 lead, but Butt pounced on 67 minutes to rescue the Magpies a point. Birmingham held Manchester United to a goalless draw at St Andrew's two weeks later and also played out a 0–0 draw at St Mary's Stadium against Southampton after that. But they were disappointing in a 1–0 loss at home to Crystal Palace on 24 October. Former Birmingham striker Andrew Johnson scored the goal for Palace, who were coming into form. Johnson ran clear of the Birmingham backline after a quick Palace counterattack.

November
Following a run of eight games without a win, Birmingham beat Liverpool 1–0 at Anfield. Veteran Darren Anderton scored the goal on 77 minutes. He turned home from one yard out after Upson had headed a corner across goal. It was Birmingham's first away win in the league all season. But Birmingham fell to a 1–0 defeat at home to Everton the following week. Thomas Gravesen scored a 69th-minute penalty after Izzet handled a shot on the goalline. Referee Rob Styles sent Izzet off and awarded Everton the spot-kick. Heskey was denied a leveller by a great last-ditch block by Tony Hibbert and Yorke wasted a late chance from ten yards. Birmingham wasted a two-goal lead at Ewood Park against Blackburn Rovers. Matt Jansen gave the hosts an early lead with an incisive finish but Anderton equalised 12 minutes later. Robbie Savage put Birmingham ahead on 38 minutes after Melchiot's marauding run down the right. Moments before half-time Dunn netted against his old side to give Birmingham a 3–1 lead at the interval. But Steven Reid and Paul Gallagher's goals in the second period rescued Rovers an unlikely point. Clinton Morrison gave Birmingham an early lead against Norwich at St Andrew's with his first goal of the campaign, but Darren Huckerby's stunning second-half strike denied the Blues their third league win of the season.

December
Arsenal thumped Birmingham 3–0 in early December. Robert Pires gave the Gunners the advantage before Thierry Henry netted twice. Birmingham bounced back by beating arch-rivals Aston Villa 2–1 on 12 December at Villa Park. Clinton Morrison scored the opener after Villa goalkeeper Thomas Sørensen let the ball slip through his hands. Shortly afterwards, David Dunn doubled Birmingham's lead after a swift counterattack. He converted Damien Johnson's cross to silence Villa Park. Gareth Barry scored a late consolation for the hosts but they were unable to prevent another defeat to their city rivals. City recorded back-to-back league wins for the first time that season when they beat West Bromwich Albion 4–0 at St Andrew's. Former Birmingham defender Darren Purse conceded a penalty by holding Morrison and Savage was able to net his third goal of the season. Morrison, who impressed throughout, scored his side's second on 23 minutes after a quick free-kick and, minutes afterwards, Heskey angled home Birmingham's third. Anderton heaped more misery on the struggling visitors by scoring a late free-kick. And Birmingham moved up to 12th for the visit of Middlesbrough on Boxing Day. Jimmy Floyd Hasselbaink had an early goal disallowed for offside before Morrison netted his third goal in as many matches. Heskey confirmed Birmingham's dominance when he headed in from six yards moments before half-time. Birmingham's impressive December form continued at Fulham on 28 December. Heskey lashed his side ahead with a stunning drive on 25 minutes but Sylvain Legwinski equalised against the run of play. Darren Carter turned home a Heskey header to restore Birmingham's advantage four minutes before half-time. Savage sealed the win with a spectacular second-half volley. Tomasz Radzinski found the net late on for a consolation goal.

January
Following a successful December, Birmingham slumped to four straight losses in January and, by the end of the month, fell to 15th in the table. By the time Emile Heskey scored at St James' Park, Birmingham were already 2–0 down to Newcastle United. Shola Ameobi and Lee Bowyer had scored. Kevin Nolan scored a last-minute winner as Bolton Wanderers won for the first time in the Premiership since October by beating Birmingham 2–1 at St Andrew's. Birmingham's dreadful run continued as they lost 3–1 at The Valley to Charlton Athletic. Steve Bruce's side didn't manage to record a single point during January. Fulham won at St Andrew's on 22 January. An own goal by Moritz Volz gave Birmingham the lead on 51 minutes. Luís Boa Morte was soon booked for diving under pressure by Birmingham goalkeeper Maik Taylor but, minutes later, Fulham were awarded a spot-kick. Boa Morte went to ground again under Damien Johnson's challenge but contact appeared to be outside the penalty box. Referee Phil Dowd awarded the penalty and Andy Cole converted. Fulham won it after Papa Bouba Diop scored a late header.

February
Birmingham signed striker Walter Pandiani and winger Jermaine Pennant on loans in January after slipping towards the relegation zone. The duo combined in their next game at St Andrew's against struggling Southampton. Pandiani headed home a Pennant cross on 12 minutes. Fellow new signing Robbie Blake scored from the penalty spot on 41 minutes after Melchiot was fouled. Southampton debutant Henri Camara netted a spectacular consolation in the second period. Three days later, on 5 February, Birmingham lost 2–0 at Old Trafford to Manchester United. Wayne Rooney scored the pick of the goals against an injury-ravaged City team. But resilient Birmingham bounced back to beat Liverpool 2–0 on 12 February. Sami Hyypiä fouled ex-Liverpool striker Heskey in the box and Pandiani duly delivered from the spot on 38 minutes. Birmingham doubled their advantage moments before half-time. Pennant crossed for Julian Gray to head in his first goal of the campaign. Birmingham completed the double over Liverpool that season. The win was followed by a 2–0 loss at Crystal Palace, who celebrated the double over Birmingham. Upson conceded two penalties, both scored by Andrew Johnson. The referee was Phil Dowd, whom Bruce publicly criticised after the match as he had now given three penalties against Birmingham in the past two games he refereed them.

March
Birmingham began March poorly, with a 2–0 defeat at West Brom. The Baggies were fighting to stay in the division and easily saw off a lethargic Birmingham team. Neil Clement and Kevin Campbell scored the second-half goals. Following an international break, Birmingham rallied to beat rivals Aston Villa and celebrated another double over their neighbours. Heskey put his side ahead on 52 minutes after another goalkeeping error by Sørensen. Gray sealed the victory late on with his second goal in four games.

April
The win over Aston Villa saw Bruce's squad climb up to 13th in the table. They faced Tottenham Hotspur at St Andrew's on 2 April. Stephen Kelly, who would later go on to become a Birmingham player, netted Spurs' opener on 59 minutes but Darren Carter levelled for the hosts on 66 minutes with his second goal of the campaign. Birmingham were denied a win against Chelsea at Stamford Bridge after a late Didier Drogba goal cancelled out another Pandiani strike. The Uruguayan was becoming a favourite with the fans, who were calling for him to be signed permanently. Birmingham drew for a third time in a row on 16 April 16 when Portsmouth travelled to St Andrew's. Chances were at a premium in a dull 0–0 draw. Manchester City thumped Birmingham City 3–0 on 20 April. Clinton Morrison thought he had given his side the lead early on but the goal was ruled out for offside. The hosts scored all their goals in the second-half, including an unfortunate own goal by Maik Taylor. Birmingham scored an early goal at Goodison Park to take the lead against Everton. Heskey powered home from 20 yards but Birmingham were denied all three points late on. Experienced forward Duncan Ferguson scored after a goalmouth scramble to rescue Everton a draw.

May
Heskey continued his impressive form in Birmingham's next game, against Blackburn Rovers. Birmingham fell behind at St Andrew's to an early Jon Stead goal but, in the second half, Blake netted his second goal for Blues. Heskey won it on 80 minutes after rifling home a long-range strike with his weaker left foot for his 10th goal of the season. But Birmingham were unable to cement back-to-back victories. They travelled to a Norwich City side fighting to stay in the league. The Canaries won the match 1–0, courtesy of a Dean Ashton penalty in the first half. Birmingham played most of the match with ten men after Damien Johnson punched an opponent. Arsenal visited St Andrew's to complete the season. Pandiani gave Birmingham the lead on 79 minutes with his fourth goal for the club after a goalmouth scramble but veteran Dennis Bergkamp equalised on 88 minutes. An error by Philippe Senderos allowed Heskey in to crash home a winner in injury time.

Match details

League table

Results summary

FA Cup

League Cup

Birmingham lost in the third round of the 2004–05 League Cup to Premier League club Fulham.

Transfers

In

 Brackets round club names denote the player's contract with that club expired before he joined Birmingham City.

Out

 Brackets round club names denote the player joined that club after his Birmingham City contract expired.

Loan in

Loan out

Appearances and goals

Numbers in parentheses denote appearances as substitute.
Players with squad numbers struck through and marked  left the club during the playing season.
Players with names in italics and marked * were on loan from another club for the whole of their season with Birmingham.

Sources
 
 
 For match dates, league positions and results: 
 For lineups, appearances, goalscorers and attendances: Matthews (2010), Complete Record, pp. 444–445.
 For goal times: 
 For transfers:

References

Birmingham City F.C. seasons
Birmingham City